The Beauregard Daily News is an American daily newspaper published in DeRidder, Louisiana. It is owned by Gannett.

The paper covers the city of DeRidder and Beauregard Parish, Louisiana, from which it takes its name.

References

External links
 
 GateHouse Media

Newspapers published in Louisiana
Beauregard Parish, Louisiana
Newspapers established in 1945
Gannett publications
1943 establishments in Louisiana